Burney is an unincorporated town and census-designated place (CDP) in Shasta County, California, United States.  Its population is 3,000 as of the 2020 census, down from 3,154 from the 2010 census.  Burney is located on State Route 299, about 4 miles west of its junction with State Route 89.

Burney has several areas for fly fishing, with wild brown and native rainbow trout in many nearby rivers and streams, including Burney Creek.  Other attractions in the area include McArthur–Burney Falls Memorial State Park, home to Burney Falls.

Burney was named after Samuel Burney, a settler in the area in the 1850s. Burney was found dead in the valley in 1857, which came to be called "the valley where Burney died," and finally just "Burney".

The town of Burney sits at the base of an extinct volcano called Burney Mountain.

History

2009 shootout

Demographics

2010
At the 2010 census Burney had a population of 3,154. The racial makeup of Burney was 2,685 (85.1%) White, 13 (0.4%) African American, 233 (7.4%) Native American, 7 (0.2%) Asian, 2 (0.1%) Pacific Islander, 61 (1.9%) from other races, and 153 (4.9%) from two or more races. Hispanic or Latino of any race were 265 people (8.4%).

The census reported that 3,035 people (96.2% of the population) lived in households, 119 (3.8%) lived in non-institutionalized group quarters, and no one was institutionalized.

There were 1,262 households, 371 (29.4%) had children under the age of 18 living in them, 638 (50.6%) were opposite-sex married couples living together, 155 (12.3%) had a female householder with no husband present, 70 (5.5%) had a male householder with no wife present.  There were 74 (5.9%) unmarried opposite-sex partnerships, and 5 (0.4%) same-sex married couples or partnerships. 344 households (27.3%) were one person and 150 (11.9%) had someone living alone who was 65 or older. The average household size was 2.40.  There were 863 families (68.4% of households); the average family size was 2.87.

The age distribution was 751 people (23.8%) under the age of 18, 240 people (7.6%) aged 18 to 24, 681 people (21.6%) aged 25 to 44, 949 people (30.1%) aged 45 to 64, and 533 people (16.9%) who were 65 or older.  The median age was 42.5 years. For every 100 females, there were 95.8 males.  For every 100 females age 18 and over, there were 91.2 males.

There were 1,446 housing units at an average density of 278.0 per square mile, of the occupied units 797 (63.2%) were owner-occupied and 465 (36.8%) were rented. The homeowner vacancy rate was 2.2%; the rental vacancy rate was 7.4%.  1,833 people (58.1% of the population) lived in owner-occupied housing units and 1,202 people (38.1%) lived in rental housing units.

2000
At the 2000 census there were 3,217 people, 1,311 households, and 912 families in the CDP. The racial makeup of the CDP was 87.97% White, 0.09% African American, 6.87% Native American, 0.65% Asian, 0.06% Pacific Islander, 2.14% from other races, and 2.21% from two or more races. Hispanic or Latino of any race were 5.97%.

Of the 1,311 households 33.5% had children under the age of 18 living with them, 54.4% were married couples living together, 11.7% had a female householder with no husband present, and 30.4% were non-families. 26.2% of households were one person and 13.7% were one person aged 65 or older.  The average household size was 2.45 and the average family size was 2.96.

The age distribution was 27.7% under the age of 18, 6.2% from 18 to 24, 23.9% from 25 to 44, 27.1% from 45 to 64, and 15.0% 65 or older.  The median age was 40 years. For every 100 females, there were 93.8 males.  For every 100 females age 18 and over, there were 89.2 males.

The median household income was $30,510 and the median family income  was $37,682. Males had a median income of $42,314 versus $25,139 for females. The per capita income for the CDP was $17,060.  About 14.8% of families and 18.0% of the population were below the poverty line, including 18.0% of those under age 18 and 11.1% of those age 65 or over.

Politics

Popular culture
Parts of the 1986 film Stand by Me were filmed within the vicinity of Burney and Fall River Mills, California.  The scene in which the boys outrace a locomotive across a trestle was filmed at Lake Britton on the McCloud River Railroad, near McArthur–Burney Falls Memorial State Park, California.

Jonathan Schmierer, Burney High School graduate, appeared on The Price Is Right during one of Bob Barker's final showings. He lost a game of Tic-Tac-Toe for a trip to the Ramada Inn in Ireland.

Climate
This region experiences warm (but not hot) and dry summers, with no average monthly temperatures above 71.6 °F.  According to the Köppen Climate Classification system, Burney has a warm-summer Mediterranean climate, abbreviated "Csb" on climate maps.

References

External links
Burney Chamber of Commerce
Rotary Club of Burney California

Census-designated places in Shasta County, California
Census-designated places in California